Ilias Malamas (born 6 August 1966) is a Greek swimmer. He competed at the 1984 Summer Olympics and the 1988 Summer Olympics.

References

1966 births
Living people
Greek male swimmers
Olympic swimmers of Greece
Swimmers at the 1984 Summer Olympics
Swimmers at the 1988 Summer Olympics
Place of birth missing (living people)